Zubrohlava is a village and municipality in Námestovo District in the Žilina Region of northern Slovakia.

History
In historical records the village was first mentioned in 1588.

Geography
The municipality lies at an altitude of 624 metres and covers an area of 15.144 km2. It has a population of about 2,044 people.

References 

Villages and municipalities in Námestovo District